Belarusian Resistance may refer to:
Belarusian resistance movement
Belarusian resistance during World War II
Belarusian opposition